New Hate is the second EP by Israeli groove metal band Betzefer, released in May 2003. It was mixed by ex-Eternal Gray guitarist Eyal Glotman and recorded in his studio, with mastering by Maor Appelbaum.

This was the band's last unsigned release, as their next release was already on the Roadrunner Records label.

Track listing

Personnel
Avital Tamir - lead vocals
Matan Cohen - guitars
Evil Haim - bass
Roey Berman - drums, percussion
Eyal Glotman - recording, mixing
Maor Appelbaum - mastering

External links
 Betzefer on bnrmetal.com

Betzefer albums
2003 EPs